Zoran Karić (born 1 August 1961 in Kačarevo, Yugoslavia) is a retired Yugoslavian soccer forward who began his career with FK Partizan before spending seventeen seasons playing indoor soccer in the United States.  He was the 1988 MISL Rookie of the Year, 1992 MISL leading scorer, 1994 NPSL MVP, and a nine time, first team All Star.

Bio
Karić began his career as a child in Yugoslavia.  He signed with FK Partizan of the Yugoslavian First Division.  In 1987, Karić moved to the United States and signed with the San Diego Sockers of Major Indoor Soccer League (MISL). He won two championships (1988, 1989) with the Sockers. In his second year in San Diego, Karić was the team's second leading scorer behind Branko Segota. He began the 1989–90 season with the Sockers, but was traded to the Cleveland Crunch for Paul Wright on 6 March 1990. Paired with Hector Marinaro, the Crunch now boasted one of the strongest pair of forwards in the league. Karić was named a first team All Star this year. In the 1990–91 season, he was the league's second leading scorer and was again named a first team All Star. Karić led the points chart during the 1991–92 season.

In the summer of 1992, the MISL collapsed and the Crunch moved to the National Professional Soccer League (NPSL). With Marinaro and Karić setting all sorts of scoring records, the Crunch reached the league finals six times in eight years, winning championships in 1994, 1996 and 1999. Karić peaked in 1994 when he finished as the NPSL points leader on the strength of his 104 assists and 85 goals. Karić was named both a first team All Star and the NPSL MVP. In 1996, he played six games with the Rochester Rhinos in the American Professional Soccer League.  Recurring tendinitis led him to leave the team on 20 July 1996.

In 2000, the Crunch decided not to resign Karić and he went to the Kansas City Attack.  However, injury had begun to slow him and he saw time in only 12 games that season. In 2001, he went to the Harrisburg Heat. Once again, he saw time in a limited number of games. In 2002, he rejoined the Crunch, now renamed the Cleveland Force. He spent two seasons with the Force, playing only four games in 2002–2003 and 23 the next season.  On 2 October 2004, the Cleveland Force signed Karić to a two-year contract, but he retired without playing a game that season. Since he left the professional game, he continues to play with Beck's Cleveland All Stars, a team in an amateur indoor soccer league in Cleveland.

In 2011, The Syracuse Silver Knights ( http://www.syracusesilverknights.com/ ) signed Karić to the team in their inaugural season. In the Knights first game, Karić recorded two assists in the 16–15 win over the Rochester Lancers.  However, he only played in 3 games before retirement, being a friend of the Silver Knights head coach, Tommy Tanner. Karic finished his professional career with Regular Season: 505 Games, 761 Goals, 849 Assists, 1,610 Points. Playoffs: 111 Games, 137 Goals, 189 Assists, 326 Points. He is the all-time leader in assists (1,038) and he’s 2nd all-time in points (1,936) in indoor soccer history.

Honors
 Rookie of the Year:
1988
 MVP:
1994
 First team All Star
1990, 1991, 1992, 1993, 1994, 1995, 1996, 1997, 1998
Goals Leader:
1992
Assists Leader:
1992, 1993, 1994, 1997, 1998, 1999
Points Leader:
1992, 1994
All-Star MVP:
1993, 1995, 1999

References

External links
 Cleveland Crunch profile
 MISL stats

1961 births
American Professional Soccer League players
Association football forwards
Cleveland Crunch (original MISL) players
Cleveland Force (2002–2005 MISL) players
FK Partizan players
Harrisburg Heat (MISL) players
Kansas City Attack players
Living people
Major Indoor Soccer League (1978–1992) players
Major Indoor Soccer League (2001–2008) players
National Professional Soccer League (1984–2001) players
Sportspeople from Pančevo
Rochester New York FC players
San Diego Sockers (original MISL) players
Serbia and Montenegro expatriate footballers
Serbia and Montenegro expatriate sportspeople in the United States
Serbia and Montenegro footballers
Syracuse Silver Knights players
Yugoslav expatriate footballers
Yugoslav expatriate sportspeople in the United States
Yugoslav footballers
Expatriate soccer players in the United States